Amanita sculpta is a species of Amanita found in Singapore, China, Japan, Malaysia, Thailand and Laos. It was first collected in the Bukit Timah Nature Reserve in 1939, and was described as new to science in 1962 by botanist E. J. H. Corner. It is a rare mushroom that has been put up for assessment for the IUCN Red List, and there were no sightings of it in Singapore until it was rediscovered there in 2020.

It is distinctive in appearance because of its large in size (10 to 27 cm diameter), beige and dark brown cap with pileal warts, that has been compared to a chocolate chip cookie.

References

External links 

sculpta
Fungi of Asia
Fungi described in 1962